John F. Kirby (January 13, 1865 – October 6, 1931) was a Major League Baseball pitcher. He played all or part of five seasons in the majors, from -, for the Kansas City Cowboys of the Union Association and St. Louis Maroons, Indianapolis Hoosiers, Cleveland Blues and Kansas City Cowboys of the American Association.

External links

1865 births
1931 deaths
Major League Baseball pitchers
Kansas City Cowboys (UA) players
Kansas City Cowboys players
St. Louis Maroons players
Indianapolis Hoosiers (NL) players
Cleveland Blues (1887–88) players
19th-century baseball players
Memphis Grays players
St. Paul Apostles players
Denver Grizzlies (baseball) players
Denver Mountaineers players
Evansville Hoosiers players
Terre Haute (minor league baseball) players
Peoria Distillers players
Oconto (minor league baseball) players
Macon Central City players
Baseball players from St. Louis